Marjie is a feminine given name. Notable people with the name include:

Marjie Lawrence (1932–2010), English actress
Marjie Lundstrom (born 1956), American journalist
Marjie Millar (1931–1966), American actress

See also
Marie (given name)
Marji

Feminine given names